Interlingua is an auxiliary language developed by the International Auxiliary Language Association.

Interlingua may also refer to:

 An alternative name for Latino Sine Flexione, an auxiliary language developed by Giuseppe Peano as a controlled variant of Neo-Latin. This language is sometimes referred to as Peano's Interlingua (abbreviated as IL)
 A general term describing any international auxiliary language.  See also interlinguistics.
 A language-neutral representation of semantic and grammatical concepts; see Interlingual machine translation.
 A name given to the fictional "basic speech" used in science fiction settings, such as Star Trek and the works of Robert A. Heinlein.

See also
Interlingue, more commonly known as Occidental, an auxiliary language originally devised by Edgar de Wahl

la:Interlingua